Rangitata is an electorate in the South Island of New Zealand. It first existed for two parliamentary terms in the late 19th century and was re-established for the 2008 general election. It largely replaced the Aoraki electorate, but included parts of the Rakaia electorate as well.

It is held by Jo Luxton of the Labour Party following the 2020 general election.  Previously it was held by Andrew Falloon of the National Party from the 2017 election up until his resignation on 21 July 2020. Rangitata was a relatively safe National seat until it changed to the Labour Party in the 2020 general election.

The electorate includes both rural areas, and towns such as Timaru and Temuka, these two towns being Labour strongholds giving the electorate a different composition to its more conservative neighbours Selwyn and Waitaki.

Population centres
In the 1887 electoral redistribution, although the Representation Commission was required through the Representation Act 1887 to maintain existing electorates "as far as possible", rapid population growth in the North Island required the transfer of three seats from the South Island to the north. Ten new electorates were created, including Rangitata, and one former electorate was recreated.

The boundaries of the Rangitata electorate were adjusted in the 2013/14 review, when an area around Rakaia was transferred to the Selwyn electorate. The boundary shifted eastwards again in the 2019/20 review, when the boundary was aligned with the Rakaia River.

The current electorate includes the following population centres (with approximate populations in brackets):
 Ashburton (20,000)
 Methven (1,300)
 Temuka (4,000)
 Timaru (42,800)

History
The election was contested by William Rolleston, who had represented  in the previously Parliament,  Searby Buxton, and William Palmer. Buxton beat Rolleston, who had been in Parliament since 1868, by 588 to 507 votes, with Palmer receiving 14 votes. Buxton held the electorate until the end of the term in 1890, when the electorate was abolished again.

The electorate was again abolished at the end of that term.

It was created after a review of electoral boundaries conducted in the wake of the 2006 census, which showed that there had been a general northwards population movement. At the time of the formation of the Rangitata electorate, Jo Goodhew was the incumbent in the Aoraki electorate.

Goodhew announced in January 2017 that she would not be contesting the 2017 general election after being dropped from cabinet. The electorate was won at the election by Andrew Falloon, retaining it for the National Party.

In mid-July 2020, Falloon announced that he would not be seeking re-election at the 2020 general election, citing personal reasons following the suicide of a friend. Following reports that Falloon had sent pornographic images to several women, he resigned as the Member for Rangitata under pressure from National Party leader Judith Collins.

On 9 August 2020, the National Party nominated Environment Canterbury councillor Megan Hands as their new candidate for Rangitata. During the 2020 general election held on 17 October, the Labour Party's candidate Jo Luxton captured Rangitata from National, defeating Hands by a final margin of 4,408 votes.

Members of Parliament
Key

List MPs
Members of Parliament elected from party lists in elections where that person also unsuccessfully contested the electorate. Unless otherwise stated, all MPs terms began and ended at general elections.

Election results

2020 election

2017 election

2014 election

2011 election

Electorate (as at 26 November 2011): 48,024

2008 election

Table footnotes

Notes

References

External links
Electorate Profile from Elections NZ

New Zealand electorates
Politics of Canterbury, New Zealand
1887 establishments in New Zealand
1893 establishments in New Zealand
2008 establishments in New Zealand
1890 disestablishments in New Zealand
1896 disestablishments in New Zealand